Tacacoma Municipality is the third municipal section of the Larecaja Province in the  La Paz Department, Bolivia. Its seat is Tacacoma.

Languages 
The languages spoken in the Tacacoma Municipality are mainly Aymara, Spanish and Quechua.  

Ref.: obd.descentralizacion.gov.bo

References 
 www.ine.gob.bo / census 2001: Tacacoma Municipality

External links 
 Old map of Larecaja Province (showing its previous political division)

Municipalities of La Paz Department (Bolivia)